The white-tailed kite (Elanus leucurus) is a small raptor found in western North America and parts of South America. It replaces the related Old World black-winged kite in its native range.

Taxonomy
The white-tailed kite was described in 1818 by the French ornithologist Louis Jean Pierre Vieillot under the binomial name Milvus leucurus with the type locality as Paraguay. It is now one of four species in the genus Elanus which was introduced in 1809 by the French zoologist Jules-César Savigny. The word Elanus is from Ancient Greek elanos for a "kite". The specific epithet leucurus is from the Ancient Greek leukouros for "white-tailed": leukos is "white" and oura is "tail".

For some recent decades, it was lumped with the black-winged kite of Europe and Africa as Elanus caeruleus and was collectively called black-shouldered kite. More recently it was argued that the white-tailed kite differed from the Old World species in size, shape, plumage, and behavior, and that these differences were sufficient to warrant full species status. This argument was accepted by the American Ornithologists' Union, so the white-tailed kite was returned to its original name. Meanwhile, the Old World E. caeruleus is once again called black-winged kite, while the name black-shouldered kite is now reserved for an Australian species, Elanus axillaris, which had also been lumped into E. caeruleus but is now regarded as separate again.

Description
The coloration of the white-tailed kite is gull-like, but its shape and flight is falcon-like, with a rounded tail. Mainly white underneath, it has black wingtips and shoulders.

Distribution and habitat
The white-tailed kite was rendered almost extinct in California in the 1930s and 1940s due to shooting and egg-collecting, but they are now common again. Their distribution is patchy, however. They can be found in the Central Valley and southern coastal areas, open land around Goleta including the Ellwood Mesa Open Space, marshes in Humboldt County, and also around the San Francisco Bay. Elsewhere in California, they are still rare or absent. They are also found from southern Texas and eastern Mexico to the Baja California Peninsula and through Central and South America to central Argentina and Chile. 
Globally, they are not considered threatened species by the IUCN. On rare occasions the bird can be found far outside its usual range. At different times, two had been sighted in New England as of 2010.

Behaviour
White-tailed kites feed principally on rodents (as well as small opossums, shrews, reptiles, amphibians and large insects), and they are readily seen patrolling or hovering over lowland scrub or grassland. They rarely if ever eat other birds, and even in open cerrado, mixed-species feeding flocks will generally ignore them. Outside the breeding season during the winter, they roost communally in groups of up to 100. However, once mating formally begins with the construction of nests by both males and females in mid-February, the female kite abstains from hunting for the time being and stays in the nest to incubate the eggs while the male brings food back to the nest for the female and children.

White-tailed kites have been observed in aerial combat at the margins of territories, locking talons in a behavior described as "grappling".

Notes

References

External links

 White-tailed Kite – Elanus Leucurus – USGS Patuxent Bird Identification InfoCenter
 White-tailed Kite Species Account – Cornell Lab of Ornithology
 White-tailed Kite Stamps at bird-stamps.org
 
 
 
 
 
 

white-tailed kite
white-tailed kite
Birds of prey of the Americas
Fauna of California
Native birds of the Southeastern United States
Native birds of the Southwestern United States
Birds of the Rio Grande valleys
white-tailed kite
white-tailed kite
Birds of the Sierra Madre Occidental